Diana Irena Belbiţă (born June 26, 1996) is a Romanian mixed martial artist, and former kickboxing, judo and kempo practitioner. She competes in the Strawweight division of the Ultimate Fighting Championship. Belbiţă is a former world and European kempo champion, as well RXF and KSW championships challenger.

Background
Belbiță entered the world of contact sports at the age of 12, when she started judo, and later went to kickboxing and karate. In 2014 she became a professional fighter and eventually managed to win the titles of European and World champion in kempo. She initially struggled with financial difficulties in her career.

In 2019, Diana appeared on Ferma, a show based on a group of celebrities living together twenty-four hours a day on a farm, with no privacy for three months and isolated from the outside world, which gave her a boost in popularity.

Mixed martial arts career

Early career
Diana Belbiță, starting her professional career in 2014, compiled a 13–4 record on the European MMA scene, with three of the losses coming to UFC/Bellator MMA veterans Cristina Stanciu, Ariane Lipski via first round armbar for the inaugural KSW Women's Flyweight Championship at KSW 39: Colosseum, and Iony Razafiarison.

Ultimate Fighting Championship
Belbiţă made her UFC debut against Molly McCann on October 18, 2019 at UFC on ESPN: Reyes vs. Weidman. She lost the fight via unanimous decision.

Belbiţă faced Liana Jojua at UFC on ESPN: Kattar vs. Ige on July 16, 2020. She lost the fight via armbar in first round.

Belbiţă faced Hannah Goldy at UFC on ESPN: Sandhagen vs. Dillashaw on July 24, 2021. She won the fight via unanimous decision.

Belbiţă faced Gloria de Paula on February 19, 2022 at UFC Fight Night: Walker vs. Hill. She lost the fight via unanimous decision.

Belbiţă was scheduled to face Loma Lookboonmee on September 17, 2022 at UFC Fight Night 210. However, Belbiţă withdraw due to undisclosed reason and was replaced by Denise Gomes.

Championships and accomplishments

Kempo
International Kempo Federation
2018 IKF World Kempo Championship Gold Medalist  
2017 IKF Kempo European Championships -60 kg/132 lb Full-Kempo Gold Medalist
United World Sport Kempo Federation
2017 UWSKF European Open Championship Gold Medalist

Kickboxing
World Association of Kickboxing Organizations
2012 WAKO Kickboxing World Cup Gold Medalist

Karate
Romanian Federation of Contact Martial Arts
2013 FRAMC Romania Budokai National Championship Sei-Budokai Gold Medalist

Mixed martial arts record 
 

|-
|Loss
|align=center|14–7
|Gloria de Paula
|Decision (unanimous)
|UFC Fight Night: Walker vs. Hill
|
|align=center|3
|align=center|5:00
|Las Vegas, Nevada, United States
|
|-
|Win
|align=center|14–6
|Hannah Goldy
|Decision (unanimous)
|UFC on ESPN: Sandhagen vs. Dillashaw 
|
|align=center|3
|align=center|5:00
|Las Vegas, Nevada, United States
|
|-
|Loss
|align=center|13–6
|Liana Jojua
|Submission (armbar)
|UFC on ESPN: Kattar vs. Ige 
|
|align=center|1
|align=center|2:47
|Abu Dhabi, United Arab Emirates
|
|-
|Loss
|align=center|13–5
|Molly McCann
|Decision (unanimous)
|UFC on ESPN: Reyes vs. Weidman 
|
|align=center|3
|align=center|5:00
|Boston, Massachusetts, United States
|
|-
|Win
|align=center|13–4
|Ana Maria Pal
|Submission (armbar)
|RXF 34
|
|align=center|2
|align=center|3:26
|Brașov, Romania
|
|-
|Win
|align=center|12–4
|Milena Bojiç
|TKO (punches)
|RXF 33
|
|align=center|1
|align=center|0:17
|Bucharest, Romania
|
|-
|Win
|align=center|11–4
|Ana Maria Pal
|Submission (armbar)
|RXF 30
|
|align=center|2
|align=center|1:35
|Bucharest, Romania
|
|-
|Win
|align=center|10–4
|Cristina Netza
|TKO (punches)
|RXF 29
|
|align=center|3
|align=center|0:49
|Brașov, Romania
|
|-
|Loss
|align=center|9–4
|Iony Razafiarison
|Submission (guillotine choke)
|Superior Fighting Championship 18
|
|align=center|2
|align=center|1:21
|Ludwigshafen, Germany
|
|-
|Win
|align=center|9–3
|Morgane Manfredi
|Decision (majority)
|RXF 27
|
|align=center|3
|align=center|5:00
|Piatra Neamț, Romania
|
|-
|Loss
|align=center| 8–3
|Ariane Lipski
|Submission (armbar)
|KSW 39: Colosseum
|
|align=center| 1
|align=center| 4:52
|Warsaw, Poland
|
|-
| Win
| align=center| 8–2
| Katarzyna Lubońska
|Decision (unanimous)
|KSW 36: Materla vs. Palhares
|
| align=center| 3
| align=center| 5:00
|Zielona Góra, Poland
| 
|-
| Win
| align=center| 7–2
| Virág Furó
| TKO (elbows)
| RXF 23
| 
| align=center| 1
| align=center| 2:08
| Bucharest, Romania
| 
|-
| Win
| align=center| 6–2
| Paulina Borkowska
| TKO (head kick and punches)
| RXF 22
| 
| align=center| 1
| align=center| 4:00
| Bucharest, Romania
| 
|-
| Loss
| align=center| 5–2
| Eeva Siiskonen
| Decision (split)
| Lappeenranta Fight Night 14
| 
| align=center| 3
| align=center| 5:00
| Lappeenranta, Finland
| 
|-
| Loss
| align=center| 5–1
| Cristina Stanciu
| Submission (armbar)
| RXF 18
| 
| align=center| 1
| align=center| 2:41
| Cluj-Napoca, Romania
| 
|-
| Win
| align=center| 5–0
| Renáta Cseh-Lantos
| Decision (unanimous)
| RXF 17
| 
| align=center| 3
| align=center| 5:00
| Craiova, Romania
| 
|-
| Win
| align=center| 4–0
| Roxana Crișan
| TKO (punches)
| Ultimate Fighting Tournament 3
| 
| align=center| 1
| align=center| N/A
| Cluj-Napoca, Romania
| 
|-
| Win
| align=center| 3–0
| Alice Ardelean
| Submission (armbar)
| RXF 14
| 
| align=center| 2
| align=center| 3:05
| Sibiu, Romania
| 
|-
| Win
| align=center| 2–0
| Roxana Dinescu
| Submission (armbar)
| RXF 12
| 
| align=center| 2
| align=center| 4:12
| Mamaia, Romania
| 
|-
| Win
| align=center| 1–0
| Roxana Crișan
| TKO (punches)
| RXF 10
| 
| align=center| 1
| align=center| 1:22
| Drobeta-Turnu Severin, Romania
|
|-

See also
 List of current UFC fighters
 List of female mixed martial artists

References

External links 
 
 

1996 births
Living people
Romanian female mixed martial artists
Flyweight mixed martial artists
Strawweight mixed martial artists
Ultimate Fighting Championship female fighters
People from Drobeta-Turnu Severin
Romanian female karateka
Romanian female kickboxers
Mixed martial artists utilizing Kenpo
Mixed martial artists utilizing karate
Eastern Orthodox Christians from Romania